Everlight is the fifth studio album by German progressive metal band Dreamscape.

Track listing

 "Final Dawn" – 2:21
 "Restless" – 5:41
 "Led Astray" – 5:09
 "Fortune and Fame" – 4:03
 "The Violet Flame Forever" – 5:31
 "A Matter of Time Transforming" – 10:37
 "One" – 4:06
 "The Calm Before The Storm" – 5:25
 "Refugium in Db-Major" – 1:16
 "A Mental Journey" – 5:29
 "Breathing Spaces" – 5:31
 "Everlight" – 7:14

Personnel
Dreamscape
Francesco Marino - lead vocals
David Bertok - keyboards
Wolfgang Kerinnis - Guitar
Danilo Batdorf - drums
Ralf Schwager - bass
Guest Vocalists
Arno Menses
Erik Blomkvist
Herbie Langhans
Dilenya Mar
Mike DiMeo
Nando Fernandez
Oliver Hartmann
Roland Stoll

External links
Everlight @ Encyclopaedia Metallum

2012 albums
Dreamscape (band) albums